William Tunicliffe (born 1864) was an English footballer who played in the Football League for Stoke. His brother John was also a footballer.

Career
Tunnicliffe was born in Hanley, Stoke-upon-Trent and played for Hanley Town before joining Stoke in 1888. He made his League debut on 8 September 1888, as a winger for Stoke in a 2–0 defeat by West Bromwich Albion at the Victoria Ground. He played in nine matches for Stoke during the first season of the Football League where he scored four goals with two braces against Burnley and Notts County. He left the club at the end of the season and joined Middlewich.

Career statistics
Source:

References

English footballers
Stoke City F.C. players
Year of death missing
1864 births
Association football wingers
Sportspeople from Hanley, Staffordshire